Gorca is a settlement in the Haloze Hills above the left bank of the Dravinja River in the Municipality of Podlehnik in eastern Slovenia. The area traditionally belonged to the Styria region. It is now included in the Drava Statistical Region.

The parish church in the settlement is dedicated to the Holy Trinity and belongs to the Roman Catholic Archdiocese of Maribor. The parish is known as Sveta Trojica–Podlehnik. The church was built in 1654.

References

External links
Gorca on Geopedia

Populated places in the Municipality of Podlehnik